Udimore  is a village and civil parish in the Rother district of East Sussex, England. It is located five miles (8 km) west of Rye on the B2089 road to Brede.

The ecclesiastical parish is teamed with Brede; the two parish churches are St George, Brede and St Mary Udimore.

Famous residents
The comedian, writer, musician, poet, playwright, soldier, and actor Spike Milligan lived in Udimore until his death in 2002.  The children's novelist Monica Edwards lived in Udimore from 1933 to 1936.

Sports teams
Udimore Cricket Club play at Churchfields. They were formed in 1937. They currently play in Division 7 of the East Sussex Cricket League and are captained by Jim Adams. The club's leading run scorer is Barry Stunt (5022 to end of season 2014) and the leading wicket taker is Julian Buss (208 to end of season 2014)

References

External links
 

Villages in East Sussex
Civil parishes in East Sussex
Rother District